The 2021 UNOH 200 presented by Ohio Logistics was the 18th stock car race of the 2021 NASCAR Camping World Truck Series, the 24th iteration of the event, and the final and thus cutoff race for the Round of 10 for the playoffs. The race was held on Thursday, September 16, 2021 in Bristol, Tennessee at Bristol Motor Speedway, a  permanent oval racetrack. The race took 200 laps to complete. In a wild finish that saw multiple lead changes in the final laps of the race, Chandler Smith of Kyle Busch Motorsports would win his first ever race in the NASCAR Camping World Truck Series, after both Sheldon Creed, who had dominated the race, and John Hunter Nemechek had issues on the final restart. To fill in the rest of the podium positions, Grant Enfinger of ThorSport Racing and John Hunter Nemechek of Kyle Busch Motorsports would finish 2nd and 3rd, respectively. 

The two drivers that were cut from the playoffs from this race were Austin Hill of Hattori Racing Enterprises and Todd Gilliland of Front Row Motorsports.

Background 

The Bristol Motor Speedway, formerly known as Bristol International Raceway and Bristol Raceway, is a NASCAR short track venue located in Bristol, Tennessee. Constructed in 1960, it held its first NASCAR race on July 30, 1961. Despite its short length, Bristol is among the most popular tracks on the NASCAR schedule because of its distinct features, which include extraordinarily steep banking, an all concrete surface, two pit roads, and stadium-like seating. It has also been named one of the loudest NASCAR tracks.

Entry list

Starting lineup 
Qualifying was determined by a metric qualifying system based on the previous race, the 2021 In It To Win It 200 and owner's points. As a result, Sheldon Creed of GMS Racing won the pole.

Race results 
Stage 1 Laps: 

Stage 2 Laps: 

Stage 3 Laps:

References 

2021 NASCAR Camping World Truck Series
NASCAR races at Bristol Motor Speedway
UNOH 200
UNOH 200